Vrbice is a municipality and village in Jičín District in the Hradec Králové Region of the Czech Republic. It has about 200 inhabitants.

Administrative parts
The village of Stříbrnice is an administrative part of Vrbice.

References

Villages in Jičín District